Park Republika Srpska  is a park in Belgrade, the capital of Serbia. It is located in the municipality of New Belgrade.

Location

The park is located in the eastern section of the municipality. It extends between the Brodarska and eastern extension of Savski nasip streets on the north, Gazela bridge on the west and the left bank of the Sava river on the south; that is, the Sava quay, which spreads out along the Sava's bank. In the north it extends into the Gazela residential local community, in the west into the neighborhood of Savski Nasip, and in the east, along the quay, into the neighborhood of Staro Sajmište.

History
The park area used to be known as the Park of the Non-aligned, after the Third World countries movement co-founded by then Yugoslav president Josip Broz Tito. The park was formed in 1978. The  park's poor maintenance over decades caused it to fall into bad shape. 

As a joint initiative of Boris Tadić (President of Serbia) and Milorad Dodik (Prime Minister of Republika Srpska), with assistance of the Belgrade city government and communal services, and plant breeders from Banja Luka,  of the park were restored, and the new park opened on 30 April 2008.

On 13 March 2020, 269 additional trees were planted in the park. They were mostly maple and various conifers. The seedlings were planted by the mayor of Belgrade Zoran Radojičić and ambassador of Sweden to Belgrade, Jan Lundin. In 2020, 79 seedlings of Japanese cherry were donated by the Japanese Business Alliance. In order to commemorate the 2020 Summer Olympics in Tokyo, they were arranged in the form of the Olympic rings in April 2021.

In November 2021 it was proposed that the quay should be named the "Bank of the Jasenovac's Victims".

Additional 60 trees were planted on 9 December 2022, commemorating the Human Rights Day, by numerous city officials, embassies representatives, and members of the human rights organizations, including Belgrade's deputy mayor Vesna Vidović and U.S. ambassador Christopher R. Hill.

Characteristics 
The creation of a new park was conducted by planting of 300 deciduous and conifer trees,  of grass turfs,  pieces of seasonal flowers, and park equipment donated by the Tamaris company from Banja Luka. The park and its promenades are already labeled one of the best arranged and an "open botanical garden", because of the unusual variety of plants in it, where "biology students can learn just by sitting on the benches".

Plants
Among the trees planted in the park are several of the rare species in Serbia, including the living fossil ginkgo biloba, North American sequoia, red beech (Fagus silvatica f. atropunicea), curly willow, yellow beech, etc. The trees are mostly planted toward the center of the park, leaving an open low plant space surrounding it. The avenue in the central alley is made of the seedlings of  the Weeping Birch, while the access walking paths to the center are made as an avenue of Norway maple and ash trees.

References 

Parks in Belgrade
New Belgrade